The Ministry of the Interior of the Republic of Croatia ( or MUP RH) is the ministry in the Government of Croatia which is in charge of state security among other roles. Croatian Police is a public service of the Ministry of the Interior.

List of ministers

 (9)
 (2)
 (1)
 (1)

(*) Ministers of Internal Affairs who held the post of Deputy Prime Minister of Croatia while in office.

Notes
 a.  Karamarko was appointed in the HDZ-dominated Sanader cabinet as a non-party minister. In 2009 he continued to serve in the Kosor cabinet and formally joined HDZ in September 2011.

Role
The Ministry of the Interior deals with administrative and other tasks related to the following:

 policing and criminal police activities that involve protection of life and personal security of people and property and the prevention and detection of crime;
 tracing and capturing of perpetrators of criminal offences and their bringing before the competent authorities;
 maintaining of public order and the protection of particular persons, citizens, facilities and premises;
 conducting of technical crime investigations and expert analysis;
 road traffic safety;
 state border protection;
 movement and stay of aliens and their admission;
 travel documents for crossing the state border;
 safeguarding at public gatherings;
 nationality affairs;
 issuing of identity cards and the registration of residence and sojourn;
 issuing of driving licences and the registration of motor vehicles;
 procurement, keeping and carrying of weapons and ammunition;
 explosive devices and substances;
 protection of the constitutional order;
 special police force tasks and the supervision over security agencies.

The Ministry is also responsible for the following: keeping the records and statistics concerning the internal affairs, the internal affairs information system and the education and training of the Ministry's officers.

Organization

 Minister's Cabinet (Kabinet ministra)
 General Police Directorate (Ravnateljstvo policije)
 Material and Financial Affairs Directorate (Uprava za materijalno financijske poslove)
 Directorate for Development, Equipment and Support (Uprava za razvoj, opremanje i potporu)
 Legal Affairs and Human Resources Directorate (Uprava za pravne poslove i ljudske potencijale)
 Administrative and Inspection Affairs Directorate (Uprava za upravne i inspekcijske poslove)
 European Integration and International Affairs Directorate (Uprava za europske integracije i međunarodne odnose)
 Special Security Affairs Directorate (Uprava za posebne poslove sigurnosti)

General Police Directorate

The General Police Directorate is in charge of the national police. There are twenty geographical commands, and the national body is organised as follows:
Police Directorate
Public Order Department
Command of Intervention Police
Department for Road Traffic Safety
Bomb Disposal Department
Criminal Police Directorate
General Crime Department
Anti-terrorism and War Crime Department
Organised Crime Department
Economic Crime and Corruption Department
Drugs Department
Special Criminal Investigations Department
Criminal Intelligence Analysis Department
Protection Unit
International Police Co-operation Department
Border Police Directorate
Neighbouring Countries Department
State Border Protection Department
Maritime and Airport Police Department
Illegal Migration Department
Centre for Training of Dog Handlers and Dog Dressure
Reception Centre for Foreigners
Mobile Unit for Static Border Control
The following units exists at the same level:
Operational Police Communication Centre
Forensic Centre
Police Academy

References

External links 
 

Interior
Croatia
Law enforcement in Croatia
National Central Bureaus of Interpol
Croatia, Interior